Christian Andreas Doppler (; 29 November 1803 – 17 March 1853) was an Austrian mathematician and physicist. He is celebrated for his principle – known as the Doppler effect – that the observed frequency of a wave depends on the relative speed of the source and the observer.

Biography

Doppler was born in Salzburg (today Austria) in 1803. After completing high school, Doppler studied philosophy in Salzburg and mathematics and physics at the University of Vienna and Imperial–Royal Polytechnic Institute (now TU Wien), where he became an assistant in 1829. In 1835 Doppler decided to immigrate to the United States to pursue a position in academia. Before departing for the United States, Doppler was offered a professorship of mathematics in Prague, which convinced him to stay in Europe. In 1835 he began work at the Prague Polytechnic (now Czech Technical University in Prague), where he received an appointment in 1841.

One year later, at the age of 38, Doppler gave a lecture to the Royal Bohemian Society of Sciences and subsequently published his most notable work, Über das farbige Licht der Doppelsterne und einiger anderer Gestirne des Himmels ("On the coloured light of the binary stars and some other stars of the heavens"). There is a facsimile edition with an English translation by Alec Eden. In this work, Doppler postulated his principle (later coined the Doppler effect) that the observed frequency of a wave depends on the relative speed of the source and the observer, and he later tried to use this concept for explaining the visible colours of binary stars (this hypothesis was later proven wrong). Doppler believed that if a star were to exceed 136,000 kilometers per second in radial velocity, then it would not be visible to the human eye.

Physicist Armand Hippolyte Louis Fizeau also contributed to aspects of the discovery of the Doppler effect, which is known by the French as the Doppler-Fizeau Effect. Fizeau contributed towards understanding its effect with light and also developed formal mathematical theorems underlying the principles of this effect. In 1848, he predicted the frequency shift of a wave when the source and receiver are moving relative to each other, therefore, being the first to predict blueshifts and redshifts of spectral lines in stars.

Doppler continued working as a professor at the Prague Polytechnic, publishing over 50 articles on mathematics, physics and astronomy, but in 1847 he left Prague for the professorship of mathematics, physics, and mechanics at the Academy of Mines and Forests (its successor is the University of Miskolc) in Selmecbánya (then Kingdom of Hungary, now Banská Štiavnica Slovakia).

Doppler's research was interrupted by the Hungarian Revolution of 1848. In 1849, he fled to Vienna and in 1850 was appointed head of the Institute for Experimental Physics at the University of Vienna. While there, Doppler, along with Franz Unger, influenced the development of young Gregor Mendel, the founding father of genetics, who was a student at the University of Vienna from 1851 to 1853.

Doppler died on 17 March 1853 at age 49 from a pulmonary disease in Venice (at that time part of the Austrian Empire). His tomb, found by Dr. Peter M. Schuster, is just inside the entrance of the Venetian island cemetery of San Michele.

Full name
Some confusion exists about Doppler's full name. Doppler referred to himself as Christian Doppler. The records of his birth and baptism stated Christian Andreas Doppler. Forty years after Doppler's death the misnomer Johann Christian Doppler was introduced by the astronomer Julius Scheiner. Scheiner's mistake has since been copied by many.

Works
 Christian Doppler (1803–1853). Wien: Böhlau, 1992.
 Bd. 1: 
 1. Teil: Helmuth Grössing (unter Mitarbeit von B. Reischl): Wissenschaft, Leben, Umwelt, Gesellschaft;
 2. Teil: Karl Kadletz (unter Mitarbeit von Peter Schuster und Ildikó Cazan-Simányi) Quellenanhang.
 Bd. 2: 
 3. Teil: Peter Schuster: Das Werk.

See also
 List of Austrian scientists
 List of Austrians
 List of minor planets named after people

References

Further reading
 Alec Eden: Christian Doppler: Leben und Werk. Salzburg: Landespressebureau, 1988. 
 Hoffmann, Robert (2007). The Life of an (almost) Unknown Person. Christian Doppler's Youth in Salzburg and Vienna. In: Ewald Hiebl, Maurizio Musso (Eds.), Christian Doppler – Life and Work. Principle an Applications. Proceedings of the Commemorative Symposia in Salzburg, Salzburg, Prague, Vienna, Venice. Pöllauberg/Austria, Hainault/UK, Atascadero/US, pages 33 – 46.
 David Nolte (2020). The fall and rise of the Doppler effect. Physics Today, v. 73, pgs. 31 - 35. DOI: 10.1063/PT.3.4429

External links

 
 Christian Doppler Platform & Christian-Doppler-Fonds

1803 births
1853 deaths
19th-century Austrian mathematicians
19th-century Austrian physicists
Austrian Roman Catholics
Austro-Hungarian people
Austrian expatriates in Hungary
Scientists from Salzburg
Burials at Isola di San Michele
Czech Technical University in Prague alumni
Academic staff of Czech Technical University in Prague
Doppler effects